Uyu Uyu (Aymara, uyu pen, yard, cemetery, the reduplication indicates that there is a group or a complex of something, "a complex of yards", Hispanicized spelling Uyo Uyo) is an archaeological site in Peru. It lies in the Arequipa Region, Caylloma Province, Yanque District, on the right bank of the Qullqa River.

See also 
 Uskallaqta

References

Archaeological sites in Arequipa Region
Archaeological sites in Peru